Gabriella Csapó-Fekete (born 23 August 1954) is a Hungarian volleyball player. She competed at the 1976 Summer Olympics and the 1980 Summer Olympics.

References

External links
 

1954 births
Living people
Hungarian women's volleyball players
Olympic volleyball players of Hungary
Volleyball players at the 1976 Summer Olympics
Volleyball players at the 1980 Summer Olympics
People from Nyíregyháza
Sportspeople from Szabolcs-Szatmár-Bereg County
20th-century Hungarian women